Mesogona oxalina is a moth of the family Noctuidae. It is found in southern and central Europe, north to Fennoscandia, east to the Baltic States  and Russia  (up to the Ural), south to the Iberian Peninsula, Italy  and Greece.

The wingspan is 34–39 mm. Adults are on wing from August to September depending on the location.

The larvae feed on Alnus, Populus, Prunus and Salix species.

External links
Fauna Europaea
Lepidoptera of Sweden
Moths and Butterflies of Europe and North Africa
Lepiforum.de

Xyleninae
Moths of Europe
Moths of Asia
Taxa named by Jacob Hübner